The Woodlawn Quaker Meetinghouse is located at 8890 Woodlawn Road in Alexandria, Virginia, United States.  The meetinghouse and its associated cemetery are significant for their role in the Quaker community in this area of Virginia in the mid to late 19th century.  The meetinghouse itself is also significant for its Quaker Plain Style architecture.  The property was added to the National Register of Historic Places on May 21, 2009, and the listing was announced as the featured listing in the National Park Service's weekly list of May 29, 2009.

The original meetinghouse, now the southern half, was built in 1853.  The northern half was added between 1866 and 1869.  Both halves are wood frame, one story, gable roofed structures.  The style reflects the Quaker belief in simplicity and lack of adornment.  The rectangular building faces east, with two entrances on the long side of the rectangle.  One entrance was for women, and one for men.  On the interior, there is a center wall with window-like opening.  The openings can be shuttered to accommodate separate meetings for men and women.  The seating is historic, simple, wooden benches.  The porch that currently wraps around the building was added at a later time.  Union soldiers occupied the building during the American Civil War, and carved their names and initials to the right of what was then the only entryway.

References

External links
 Alexandria Friends Meeting at Woodlawn

Churches in Fairfax County, Virginia
Churches completed in 1853
19th-century Quaker meeting houses
Churches on the National Register of Historic Places in Virginia
Quaker meeting houses in Virginia
Quakerism in Virginia
Churches completed in 1869
National Register of Historic Places in Fairfax County, Virginia
1869 establishments in Virginia